Lucas Hauchard (born 27 January 1996), known professionally as Squeezie, is a French YouTuber. He is the most well-known francophone gamer with over 17 million subscribers and 9 billion views. He specialises in Let's Play commentaries and vlogs, and also collaborated with Cyprien Iov on Bigorneaux & Coquillages, a channel with over 6 million subscribers as of May 2021. In September 2018, he launched a gaming channel titled Squeezie Gaming on which are exposed edited videos of his lives on Twitch.
3.el4 ig

Early life and career

Debuts on YouTube 

Lucas Hauchard launched on YouTube in May 2008 with a first channel specialized in the game Dofus, Dofus Bouclier. This channel, inactive since June 2008, has two videos. In November 2010, he created another channel, TheVideobc, inactive since November 18, 2010, which has three videos; it also has a video game thematics.

He created his current YouTube channel under the pseudonym Squeezie in 2011, at the age of 15. Focused on video games testing, his channel achieved a fairly high profile, making him the youngest French person to gain over one million subscribers on YouTube, at the age of 17. He reached about 300,000 views per video during this period, during which he obtained his baccalauréat.

Growing popularity 

In April 2013, when he had half a million subscribers, he teamed up with Cyprien, another French YouTuber, to create the channel CyprienGaming (currently Bigorneaux & Coquillage).

In 2014, he was frequently accused of plagiarising PewDiePie, an accusation he refuted through a video. In March 2014, according to SocialBlade, Lucas Hauchard became the most popular French YouTuber, ahead of The Sound you Need, Cyprien, Rémi Gaillard and Norman. At the end of 2014, the same website reported that Squeezie's videos were viewed 70.7 million times, more than Rémi Gaillard, Norman and Cauet combined.

He appears in the YouTube Rewind 2015, a video created by YouTube bringing together YouTubers and Internet personalities who marked the year.

In 2017, he participated in Fort Boyard, with Cyprien. Squeezie peaked at more than 1,860,000 subscribers in 2017, adding more than a billion to its viewing meter. He surpassed Norman in number of subscribers in June 2018 and then Cyprien a year later, becoming the first French-language videographer in number of subscribers.

On Twitch 
Squeezie started regular live broadcasts on Twitch in 2018. He has more than 3 million followers and he participated in the French-speaking live with the most viewers with a peak of 395,000 viewers with some of the biggest French streamers such as Gotaga and Locklear. In October 2022, Squeezie hosted a 22-streamer race using Formula 4 cars, averaging 400,000 viewers and reaching a peak of over 1,000,000, along with 40,000 spectators at the track.

Music 

Squeezie has created a lot of music over the years. He started selling his first album, named Oxyz, the 25 September 2020. He release his first song in 2017 in a YouTube video named “Placements de Produits” with Maxence. 

In 2018, Squeezie released more songs such as, Freestyle de l'autodérision,  top 1,  Freestyle de potes feat. Maxenss and Seb, pas tout seul and 90 VS 2000 feat. Mcfly and Carlito.

In 2019, he released two songs, Le gaming c'est fini and Bye bye feat. Joyca. Squeezie and Joyca dilmed a video where they compose in collaboration a summer hit in 3 days, Bye Bye, in competition with Kezah and Freddy Gladieux, who composed the song Mirador with the same constraints. They are then judged by the singer/rapper Gims who designates Mirador as "winner". The two singles have had some success, going so far as to be performed live at the Solidays 2019 music festival by their authors. They are also broadcast in several nightclubs and on national radio stations such as Fun Radio. The two singles are classified in the sales rankings of several musical platforms and the title Mirador will even be officially certified gold.

Discography

Albums 

 2020: Oxyz

Singles 

 2017: Placements de produits feat. Maxenss
 2018: Freestyle de l'autodérision
 2018: Top 1
 2018: Freestyle de potes feat. Maxenss and Seb la Frite
 2018: Pas tout seul
 2018: 90 VS 2000 feat. Mcfly and Carlito
 2019: Le gaming c'est fini
 2019: Bye bye feat. Joyca
 2020: Influenceurs
 2020: Guépard feat. Némir
 2020: Servis feat. Gambi
 2020: Tout
 2020: Mario Kart
 2021: Time Time feat. KronoMuzik and Myd (as Trei Degete)
 2022: Adieu les filles

Filmography

Dubbing

Cinema 

 2015: The SpongeBob Movie: Sponge Out of Water by Paul Tibbitt: Kyle the Seagull (voice)
 2016: Ratchet & Clank by Kevin Munroe: Ratchet

Web-series 

 2016: Les Kassos (episode 42, Irrito)
 2018: L'Épopée temporelle (season 2, episode 1, Le temps cassé) by Cyprien Iov
 2015: Technophobe by Théodore Bonnet
 2016: The Cartouche by Théodore Bonnet

References

1996 births
French YouTubers
Living people
People from Vitry-sur-Seine
Comedy YouTubers
Let's Players
YouTube vloggers
Gaming YouTubers
Twitch (service) streamers